"If It's Love" is the second single from Train's fifth studio album, Save Me, San Francisco.

It debuted at No. 31 on Billboards Hot Adult Top 40 Tracks chart. and has since become Train's second-consecutive No. 1 hit from the album, as well as their fourth No. 1 overall. This ties the band with Matchbox 20 and Daughtry for second-most chart-topping singles in format history, and trailing only Nickelback in total Adult Top 40 No. 1 placements. It is also the 100th single to go No. 1 in the format's history.

In addition, it has reached No. 34 on the Billboard Hot 100.

A music video for the song debuted on VH1.com on May 11, 2010.

Background

In a 2010 interview with The Post-Crescent, Pat Monahan confirmed "If It's Love" was written the same day as their hit "Hey, Soul Sister" and was intended as a thank-you song to long-time fans of the band:

Much like "Hey, Soul Sister", the track features a handful of pop cultural references including Winger (an American hard rock band that enjoyed popularity in the late 80s and early 90s), and "The Rain in Spain" (a song featured in the musical My Fair Lady).

In addition, the lyrics "There's no happy endings, No Henry Lee" refer to the inscription and the main character in Jamie Ford's 2009 novel Hotel on the Corner of Bitter and Sweet.

In a 2010 interview, Monahan explained the lyric "I wanna buy you everything except cologne, 'cause it's poison."

In 2011, Slovenian media outlet 24ur reported similarities between "If It's Love" and "A veš", a song by Slovenian singer Alya, released in 2007. The band was then sued by Slovenian singer-songwriter Jan Plestenjak (the original author of the song) for copyright infringement, claiming the song's chorus was copied from his song "A veš". The matter was settled out of court for an undisclosed sum in June 2018.

Music video
As with the origins of the song, the music video is a thank-you to the fans. It references what the band supposedly did during their three-year hiatus, including clips of Jimmy pawning a guitar, Scott panhandling, and Pat sitting in bed as Train appears on Where are They Now?. The video also features the band performing on a red carpet and at the Oakland Theater, and appearing in a commercial where Jimmy and Scott are wearing chicken suits. The video was directed by Pete Wentz and Bill Fishman, with an cameo appearance by Hugh Jackman.

Chart performance

Weekly charts

Year-end charts

Certifications

References

2010 singles
Train (band) songs
Songs written by Gregg Wattenberg
Songs written by Pat Monahan
2009 songs
Song recordings produced by Espionage (production team)